Five Across the Eyes may refer to:

 Five Across the Eyes (album), a 1999 album by Iniquity
 Five Across the Eyes (film), a suspense/horror film directed by Greg Swinson and Ryan Thiessen